The Walker Brothers' Story is a compilation album by the American pop group The Walker Brothers. It was released in soon after the group's dissolution in the mid-1967 and reached number nine on the UK Albums Chart.

Unusually for a greatest hits compilation, the album does not include all of the group's major hits. The group's breakthrough single "Love Her" is notably absent. The UK and German editions of the album have differing track listings.

Track listing

UK version

German version
Side one
 "The Sun Ain't Gonna Shine Anymore"
 "Land of a 1,000 Dances"
 "Love Minus Zero"
 "Living Above Your Head"
 "I Need You"
 "My Ship Is Coming In"
Side two
 "Saturday's Child"
 "Make It Easy on Yourself"
 "Dancing in the Street"
 "I Can See It Now"
 "Tell The Truth"
 "Summertime"
Side three
 "In My Room"
 "Stand by Me"
 "Once Upon A Summertime"
 "Lonely Winds"
 "Come Rain or Come Shine"
 "Archangel"
Side four
 "People Get Ready"
 "Stay With Me Baby"
 "Take It Like A Man"
 "No Sad Songs For Me"
 "Hurting Each Other"
 "Just Say Goodbye"

References

The Walker Brothers albums
1967 compilation albums
Albums produced by Johnny Franz
Philips Records albums